Joshi kōsei, joshi kousei or joshikōsei literally means "high school girl". In English usage the term may refer to:
High School Girls, a comedy manga series by Towa Oshima
Joshi Kausei a comedy manga series by Ken Wakai.
Oku-sama wa Joshi Kōsei, a manga series by Hiyoko Kobayashi
 JK business, compensated dating with adolescent girls in Japan
 A homonym (joshi kōsei, which can mean "girl student") that is used to label Japanese pornographic videos hinting that high school girls are portrayed